The UNESCO (United Nations Educational, Scientific and Cultural Organization) has designated 94 World Heritage Sites in nine countries (also called "state parties") of Eastern Europe; defined here to mean the former Eastern Bloc countries not including the Baltic states (which are in Northern Europe) or former Yugoslavia and Albania (which are in Southern Europe) or the parts of Germany that once comprised East Germany (which are included in Western Europe): Russia, Belarus, Poland, Czech Republic, Slovakia, Hungary, Ukraine, Moldova, Romania and Bulgaria. The uniquely positioned Caucasian countries of Armenia, Georgia, and Azerbaijan are not included here but in Western Asia, and Kazakhstan is included in Central Asia.

Russia is home to the most inscribed sites with 20 sites in Eastern Europe out of 29 sites in the whole country, two of which are transborder properties. Eight sites are shared between several countries with some of them located partially in Northern or Western Europe: the Curonian Spit (Lithuania and Russia), Caves of Aggtelek Karst and Slovak Karst (Slovakia and Hungary), Primeval Beech Forests of the Carpathians and Other Regions of Europe (Germany, Slovakia, Ukraine, Albania, Austria, Belgium, Bulgaria, Croatia, Italy, Romania, Slovenia, and Spain), Belovezhskaya Pushcha / Białowieża Forest (Poland and Belarus), Fertö / Neusiedlersee Cultural Landscape (Austria and Hungary), Muskauer Park / Park Mużakowski (Germany and Poland), the Struve Geodetic Arc (ten countries in Northern and Eastern Europe), and Erzgebirge/Krušnohoří Mining Region (Czech Republic and Germany). Moldova has only part of the Struve Geodetic Arc transborder site. The first sites from the region were inscribed in 1978, when Kraków's Historic Centre and the Wieliczka Salt Mine, both in Poland were chosen during the list's conception. Each year, UNESCO's World Heritage Committee may inscribe new sites on the list, or delist sites that no longer meet the criteria. Selection is based on ten criteria: six for cultural heritage (i–vi) and four for natural heritage (vii–x). Some sites, designated "mixed sites," represent both cultural and natural heritage. In Eastern Europe, there are 69 cultural, 8 natural, and no mixed sites.

The World Heritage Committee may also specify that a site is endangered, citing "conditions which threaten the very characteristics for which a property was inscribed on the World Heritage List." None of the sites in Eastern Europe is currently listed as endangered; two sites, Wieliczka Salt Mine and the Srebarna Nature Reserve, have formerly been listed as endangered but lost this status subsequently; possible danger listing has been considered by UNESCO in a number of cases.

Legend

Site; named after the World Heritage Committee's official designation
Location; at city, regional, or provincial level and geocoordinates
Criteria; as defined by the World Heritage Committee
Area; in hectares and acres. If available, the size of the buffer zone has been noted as well. A value of zero implies that no data has been published by UNESCO
Year; during which the site was inscribed to the World Heritage List
Description; brief information about the site, including reasons for qualifying as an endangered site, if applicable

World Heritage Sites

Notes

References
Notes

Europe
Eastern Europe
Tourism in Eastern Europe